David B. Sullivan (born June 6, 1953 in Fall River, Massachusetts) was a member of the Massachusetts House of Representatives, representing the 6th Bristol District.  He is a member of the Democratic Party.

He is a graduate of Bristol Community College and Southeastern Massachusetts University, and completed his graduate studies at Bridgewater State College.  He was a member of the Fall River City Council from 1992 to 1997, served in the Massachusetts House of Representatives from 1997 to 2013, and he was the executive director of the Fall River Housing Authority from 2013 until his retirement in 2017.

References

Democratic Party members of the Massachusetts House of Representatives
Politicians from Fall River, Massachusetts
University of Massachusetts Dartmouth alumni
Massachusetts city council members
1953 births
Living people
Bridgewater State University alumni